Danica Dakić (born 1962) in Sarajevo) is a Bosnian artist and university professor. She works primarily with video art, installation and photography. Her works have been widely exhibited, including at documenta 12 (2007) and at the 58th Venice Biennale (2019), where she represented Bosnia and Herzegovina. Dakić lives and works in Düsseldorf, Weimar, and Sarajevo.

Life and education 
Danica Dakić was born in 1962 in Sarajevo and grew up in Yugoslavia. She studied from 1981 to 1985 at the Sarajevo Academy of Arts and then moved to the University of Arts in Belgrade, where she continued her studies until 1988 and completed her master's degree in painting. In 1988 she left Yugoslavia and went to Germany, where she studied from 1988 to 1990 at the Kunstakademie Düsseldorf in the class of Nam June Paik.

She spent the Bosnian war in Germany and in 1997 she returned to Sarajevo for the first time.

Work 
Dakić works across all media – from drawing to photography, video and sound works, film, performances, and sculptural objects. Employing performative and participatory processes, she creates images and voices that interrogate ever-changing social, political, and cultural contexts also for their utopian potential. In her works she also incorporates personal factors. Her working method is characterised by her longstanding collaboration with the photographer Egbert Trogemann, the composer Bojan Vuletić, and the producer Amra Bakšić Čamo. Her projects are based on often lengthy research and production processes, which make intensive collaboration with the protagonists in her works indispensable. Starting out from a particular architecture, a historical place, or an (art) historical image, she creates stages with the participants on which individual worlds of images and narratives are created, beyond political, social, or economic classifications and codifications.

The Bosnian War and the Siege of Sarajevo had a profound influence on her artistic development and her early work. Beginning in 1997, in collaboration with the Sarajevo Center for Contemporary Art (SCCA), she developed works in Sarajevo's urban spaces that engaged with the upheavals of a post-war society and that uncover processes of language development: In the video projection MADAME X (1997) she positioned herself for the first time in her hometown after all the changes caused by the war. In an alleyway in Sarajevo, her speaking mouth could be seen, but no sounds were heard. In her work WITNESS (1998), she placed a video and sound intervention on the empty pedestal of the monument to the writer Ivo Andrić in Sarajevo's city park, to question the rewriting of history in times of great upheavals using the example of the missing bust of the Nobel Prize winner.

Collections 
 Tate Modern, London 
 Centre Georges-Pompidou, Paris
 Museum of Contemporary Art of Bordeaux 
 MACBA - Museu d'Art Contemporani de Barcelona

Exhibitions

Selected solo exhibitions 

 2002: Prayer, Kunstverein Ulm.
 2005: Role Taking, Role Making, Kulturzentrum Sinsteden, Rhein-Kreis Neuss
 2008: Triptychon. Mala Galerija, Museum of Modern Art, Ljubljana
 2009: Danica Dakić, Kunsthalle Düsseldorf
 2010: Danica Dakić. Role-Taking, Role-Making, Generali Foundation, Vienna
 2011: Danica Dakić, Hammer Museum, Los Angeles
 2013: Danica Dakić: Safe Frame, Museum für Moderne Kunst Frankfurt
 2017: Danica Dakić – Missing Sculpture, Lehmbruck Museum, Duisburg
 2019: Zenica Trilogy, Bosnia and Herzegovina Pavilion at the 58th Biennale di Venezia
 2019/2020: Zenica Trilogie, Bauhaus Museum Weimar

Selected group exhibitions

 1999: La casa, il corpo, il cuore – Konstruktion der Identitäten, MUMOK, Vienna.
 2003: In den Schluchten des Balkan, Kunsthalle Fridericianum, Kassel.
 2005: Skulptur Biennale Münsterland, Borken.
 2007: Talking Pictures, K21 Kunstsammlung NRW, Düsseldorf.
 2007: Das ABC der Bilder, Pergamonmuseum, Berlin.

Publications 

 Danica Dakić. With texts from Boris Buden, Söke Dinkla, Ronja Friedrichs, Peter Gorschlüter, Sabine Maria Schmidt, Verlag für Moderne Kunst, 2018. 
 Danica Dakić: Emily, Gandy gallery 2011. 
 Danica Dakić. With texts from Horst Bredekamp, Tom Holert, Sabine Folie, Ulrike Groos, Tihomir Milovac, Verlag der Buchhandlung Walther Koenig, 2009. 
 Danica Dakić: Casa del Lago, Kunsthaus Langenthal, 2009. 
 Danica Dakić: Role-Taking, Role-Making, Verlag für moderne Kunst, Düsseldorf 2005. 
 Danica Dakić: Voices and Images, Revolver, Frankfurt am Main, 2004. 
 Danica Dakić: Zenica Trilogy, exhibition catalogue, The Pavilion of Bosnia and Herzegovina at the 58th International Art Exhibition – La Biennale di Venezia, 2019.

References

External links 
 Official website

Living people
1982 births
Artists from Sarajevo
20th-century Bosnia and Herzegovina artists
21st-century Bosnia and Herzegovina artists
20th-century women artists
21st-century women artists